Croton is an extensive flowering plant genus in the spurge family, Euphorbiaceae. The plants of this genus were described and introduced to Europeans by Georg Eberhard Rumphius.  The common names for this genus are rushfoil and croton, but the latter also refers to Codiaeum variegatum. The generic name comes from the Greek , which means "tick" and refers to the shape of the seeds of certain species.

Description
Croton is a diverse and complex taxonomic group of plants ranging from herbs and shrubs to trees. A well-known member of this genus is Croton tiglium, a shrub native to Southeast Asia. It was first mentioned in European literature by Cristóbal Acosta in 1578 as lignum pavanae. The oil, used in herbal medicine as a violent purgative, is extracted from its seeds. Currently, it is considered unsafe and it is no longer listed in the pharmacopeias of many countries.

Taxonomy

Uses

Traditional uses
C. tiglium oil has been used in traditional Chinese medicine to treat severe constipation or heal lesions, and is used as a purgative. Wang Haogu first observed that croton seeds could also be used to treat diarrhea. It is a source of the organic compound phorbol and its tumor-promoting esters, such as 12-O-tetradecanoylphorbol-13-acetate.  In the Amazon, the red latex from the species C. lechleri, known as sangre de drago (dragon's blood), is used as a "liquid bandage", as well as for other medicinal purposes, by native peoples.

Food uses
Cascarilla (C. eluteria) bark is used to flavour the liquor Campari and Vermouth.

Biofuel uses 

In Kenya, Croton nuts, such as those from C. megalocarpus, were found to be a more economical source of biofuel than Jatropha curcas.  Jatropha curcas requires as much as 20,000 litres of water to make a litre of biofuel, while Croton trees grow wild and yield about 35 percent oil. Croton trees are planted as a windbreak in Kenya, and their use as a source of biofuel may benefit rural economies there. As arable land is under population pressure, people have been cutting down the windbreaks to expand farmland. This new use may save the windbreaks, which should help fight desertification.

Ecology  

Croton species are used as food plants by the larvae of some Lepidoptera species, including Schinia citrinellus, which feeds exclusively on the plant.

Distribution

The genus is pantropical, with some species extending into temperate areas.
It is one of the largest and most complex genera of angiosperms in Madagascar, where up to 150 Croton species are endemic.

Formerly placed here

References

External links
Croton Research Network  
A Modern Herbal--Croton

 
Euphorbiaceae genera
Medicinal plants
Pantropical flora